Xanthina is a genus of flies in the family Dolichopodidae.

Species
Xanthina acuticornis Robinson, 1975
Xanthina attenuata Robinson, 2003
Xanthina dominicensis Robinson, 1975
Xanthina flagellifera Robinson, 2003
Xanthina flava (Aldrich, 1896)
Xanthina nigromaculata Van Duzee, 1931
Xanthina persetosa Robinson, 1975
Xanthina plumicauda Aldrich, 1902
Xanthina rubromarginata Robinson, 1975
Xanthina schildi Robinson, 2003
Xanthina squamifera Robinson, 2003
Xanthina subcurva Van Duzee, 1931
Xanthina turrialbae Robinson, 2003

References

Dolichopodidae genera
Achalcinae
Insects of Central America
Taxa named by John Merton Aldrich